The 1963 South Boston 400 was a NASCAR Grand National Series event that was held on April 14, 1963, at South Boston Speedway in South Boston, Virginia.

The transition to purpose-built racecars began in the early 1960s and occurred gradually over that decade.  Changes made to the sport by the late 1960s brought an end to the "strictly stock" vehicles of the 1950s.

Race report
Ned Jarrett and Richard Petty would be the only lap leaders for this race; with Petty leading the most laps. There were 400 laps in this one-hour-and-fifty-nine-minute race. Last-place finisher Joe Weatherly had to withdraw from the race on lap 48 due to troubles with his vehicle's rear end. Only him, Jimmy Pardue, Neil Castles, Billy Wade and Larry Thomas failed to finish the race out of this grid of 16 American-born drivers.

Jim Paschal was defeated by his Petty Enterprises teammate Richard Petty by two laps in front a live audience of five thousand people. Most of the drivers on the starting grid used Chevrolet as their manufacturer while Plymouth and Dodge took up a sizeable amount of the grid; model years for the vehicles varied from 1961 to 1963, as allowances were made for older vehicles before NASCAR become modernized.

Larry Manning scores his first of two career top five finishes.

Winnings for this race varied from $1,500 for the winner ($ when considering inflation) and $380 for the last-place driver ($ when considering inflation); with the total prize purse consisting of $6,095 ($ when considering inflation). Earl Brooks would make first "top five" finish here out of the three that he performed during his professional stock car racing career.

Notable crew chiefs for this race include Crawford Clements, Franklin McMillion, Johnny Divers, and Herman Beam.

Qualifying

Finishing order
Section reference: 

 Richard Petty (No. 43)
 Jim Paschal (No. 41)
 Ned Jarrett (No. 11)
 Larry Manning (No. 09)
 Earl Brooks (No. 134)
 Herman Beam (No. 19)
 Wendell Scott (No. 34)
 David Pearson (No. 6)
 Buck Baker (No. 87)
 E.J. Trivette (No. 0)
 Curtis Crider (No. 62)
 Larry Thomas* (No. 49)
 Billy Wade* (No. 5)
 Neil Castles* (No. 86)
 Jimmy Pardue* (No. 54)
 Joe Weatherly* (No. 83)

* Driver failed to finish race

Timeline
Section reference: 
 Start of race: Ned Jarrett started the race with the pole position.
 Lap 48: Joe Weatherly had problems with his vehicle's rear end, forcing him to withdraw from the race.
 Lap 64: Jimmy Pardue's would see his vehicle's rear end become problematic, forcing him to exit from the event.
 Lap 145: Neil Castles would end up having a defective engine, causing him to leave the race prematurely.
 Lap 210: Billy Wade's vehicle would develop engine problems, sparking his early exodus from the event.
 Lap 254: Larry Thomas would have problems with his vehicle's rear end, forcing him to leave the race early.
 Finish: Richard Petty won the race.

References

South Boston 400
South Boston 400
NASCAR races at South Boston Speedway